Wuhan (169) is the second ship of Type 052B destroyer of the People's Liberation Army Navy. She was commissioned in December 2004.

Development and design 

Type 052B multirole missile destroyer was the first Chinese-built warship capable of area air defence. The displacement of the Type 052B is about 5850 tons standard and 6500 tons full load. The ship features a "low point" design and combines this with radar absorbing paint to reduce radar signature. The ship's funnel incorporates cooling devices to reduce infrared signatures. The stern flight deck can host a Kamov Ka-28 ASW helicopter.

Construction and career 
Wuhan was launched in February 2002 at the Jiangnan Shipyard in Shanghai. She was commissioned in December 2004.

On April 2, 2008, the commander of the U.S. Marine Corps, General James Conway, accompanied by Major General Zhang Leiyu, Deputy Chief of Naval Staff of the People's Liberation Army, began a two-day visit to the South China Sea Fleet. During the visit, Wuhan and Luo Xiaoshan were open to visit. On December 26, 2008, Wuhan, Haikou and Weishanhu formed the first escort fleet of the Chinese Navy. They set sail from a military port terminal in Sanya City, Hainan Province, and escorted to the Gulf of Aden and Somali waters. The escort mission lasted 124 days and nights with a voyage of more than 33,000 nautical miles. It provided escort for 41 batches of 166 ships, provided regional escorts for 46 ships and successfully rescued 3 foreign ships from being attacked. On April 28, 2009, they returned to the station.

On July 26, 2010, Wuhan participated in a live-fire exercise of the Navy's multi-arms contract organized by the South China Sea Fleet. The exercise was held in a certain area of the South China Sea, highlighting the actual use of weapons in contracted seas, air defense and missile defense, and air control in a complex electromagnetic environment.

Gallery

References 

2002 ships
Ships built in China
Type 052B destroyers